Malinov is a surname. Notable people with the surname include:

Aleksandar Malinov (1867–1938), Bulgarian politician and Prime Minister of Bulgaria
Kristiyan Malinov (born 1994), Bulgarian footballer
Ofelia Malinov (born 1996), Italian volleyball player of Bulgarian descent
Petar Malinov (born 1970), Bulgarian footballer
Svetoslav Malinov (born 1968), Bulgarian politician

Bulgarian-language surnames